Dumitru Cuc (24 March 1928 – 24 November 2019) was a Romanian wrestler. He competed in the men's Greco-Roman lightweight at the 1952 Summer Olympics.

References

External links
 

1928 births
2019 deaths
Romanian male sport wrestlers
Olympic wrestlers of Romania
Wrestlers at the 1952 Summer Olympics
People from Bihor County